Osman Gazi refers to Osman I, the first Sultan of the Ottoman Empire.

Osman Gazi or Osmangazi may also refer to:

 Osmangazi, a municipality and district of Bursa Province, Turkey
 Osmangazi Tunnel, a road tunnel in western Turkey
 , an amphibious warfare ship of the Turkish Navy
 Osmangazi Bridge,  a suspension bridge in southeast of Istanbul, Turkey
 Kuruluş: Osman, Turkish drama-series, also called Osman Ghazi

See also
 Gazi Osman Pasha